Almanzo is a masculine given name. Notable people with the given name include:

 Almanzo W. Litchard (1841–1906), American soldier, farmer, and legislator
 Almanzo Wilder (1857?–1949), American relative of authors